Warner is a town in Clark County in the U.S. state of Wisconsin. As of the 2000 census, the town had a total population of 627. The unincorporated community of Hemlock is located in the town.

Geography
According to the United States Census Bureau, the town has a total area of 35.0 square miles (90.6 km2), of which, 34.9 square miles (90.3 km2) of it is land and 0.1 square miles (0.3 km2) of it (0.37%) is water.

Demographics
As of the census of 2000, there were 627 people, 195 households, and 164 families residing in the town. The population density was 18.0 people per square mile (6.9/km2). There were 208 housing units at an average density of 6.0 per square mile (2.3/km2). The racial makeup of the town was 98.41% White, 1.28% Asian, and 0.32% from two or more races. Hispanic or Latino of any race were 0.16% of the population.

There were 195 households, out of which 47.2% had children under the age of 18 living with them, 75.4% were married couples living together, 4.6% had a female householder with no husband present, and 15.4% were non-families. 13.3% of all households were made up of individuals, and 7.7% had someone living alone who was 65 years of age or older. The average household size was 3.16 and the average family size was 3.44.

In the town, the population was spread out, with 35.1% under the age of 18, 5.7% from 18 to 24, 26.3% from 25 to 44, 22.2% from 45 to 64, and 10.7% who were 65 years of age or older. The median age was 35 years. For every 100 females, there were 101.6 males. For every 100 females age 18 and over, there were 106.6 males.

The median income for a household in the town was $37,273, and the median income for a family was $40,179. Males had a median income of $34,167 versus $21,042 for females. The per capita income for the town was $13,443. About 3.8% of families and 7.9% of the population were below the poverty line, including 7.7% of those under age 18 and 4.0% of those age 65 or over.

References

Towns in Wisconsin
Towns in Clark County, Wisconsin